Daiano is a frazione of the comune (municipality) of Ville di Fiemme in Trentino in the northern Italian region Trentino-Alto Adige/Südtirol, located about  northeast of Trento. It was marged with Varena and Carano on 1 January 2020.
 

 

Cities and towns in Trentino-Alto Adige/Südtirol